The history of the Greek alphabet starts with the adoption of Phoenician letter forms in the 9th–8th centuries BC during early Archaic Greece and continues to the present day. The Greek alphabet was developed during the Iron Age centuries after the loss of Linear B, the syllabic script that was used for writing Mycenaean Greek until the Late Bronze Age collapse and Greek Dark Age. This article concentrates on the development of the alphabet before the modern codification of the standard Greek alphabet.

The Phoenician alphabet was strictly speaking one that was consistently explicit only about consonants, though even by the 9th century BC it had developed matres lectionis to indicate some, mostly final, vowels. This arrangement is much less suitable for Greek than for Semitic languages, and these matres lectionis, as well as several Phoenician letters which represented consonants not present in Greek, were adapted according to the acrophonic principle to represent Greek vowels consistently, if not unambiguously.

The Greek alphabet was developed by a Greek with first-hand experience of contemporary Phoenician script. Almost as quickly as it was established in the Greek mainland, it was rapidly re-exported, eastwards to Phrygia, where a similar script was devised. It was also exported westwards with Euboean or West Greek traders, where the Etruscans adapted the Greek alphabet to their own language, which eventually led to the Latin alphabet.

Chronology of adoption

Most specialists believe that the Phoenician alphabet was adopted for Greek during the early 8th century BC, perhaps in Euboea. The earliest known fragmentary Greek inscriptions date from this time, 770–750 BC, and they match Phoenician letter forms of c. 800–750 BC. The oldest substantial texts known to date are the Dipylon inscription and the text on the so-called Cup of Nestor, both dated to the late 8th century BC, inscriptions of personal ownership and dedications to a god.
Tradition recounts that a daughter of a certain Agamemnon, king of Aeolian Cyme, married a Phrygian king called Midas. This link may have facilitated the Greeks "borrowing" their alphabet from the Phrygians because the Phrygian letter shapes are closest to the inscriptions from Aeolis.
Some scholars argue for earlier dates: Naveh (1973) for the 11th century BC, Stieglitz (1981) for the 14th century, Bernal (1990) for the 18th–13th century, some for the 9th, but none of these are widely accepted.

The Fayum alphabet, originating on Cyprus, seems to be even older than the fragmentary Greek inscriptions mentioned above: it is dated to c. 800 BC and appears to preserve the earliest known form of the Greek alphabet. This could indicate that the Phoenician alphabet was adapted to Greek on Cyprus, where an important Phoenician colony existed at the time in the city-kingdom of Kition; however, the Cypriot syllabary, which was already employed at the time to write the local dialect, having been in use since the 11th century, remained in use in Cyprus until the 4th century BC and was not replaced by the adapted Phoenician alphabet this early.

Another possibility is that the adaptation happened on Thera, which Herodotus and Pausanias claim to have been settled early by Phoenicians descending from Cadmus (see below; the legendary Greek ruler Theras, who is alleged by Herodotus and Pausanias to have founded Ancient Thera, was descended from Cadmus as well); however, a Phoenician presence on the island has not been proven archaeologically.

Herodotus' account
According to legends recounted by Herodotus, the alphabet was first introduced to Greece by a Phoenician named Cadmus:

Herodotus estimates that Cadmus lived sixteen hundred years earlier, or around 2000 BC. He had seen and described the Cadmean writing engraved on certain tripods in the temple of Apollo at Thebes. He estimated that those tripods dated back to the time of Laius, the great-grandson of Cadmus. On one of the tripods there was this inscription in Cadmean writing, which as he attested, resembled Ionian letters:  ("Amphitryon dedicated me from the spoils of [the battle of] Teleboae."). A second tripod bears the inscription in hexameter verse:
. ("Scaeus the boxer, victorious in the contest, dedicated me to Apollo, the archer god, a lovely offering"). Herodotus estimated that if Scaeus, the son of Hippocoon was the dedicator and not another of the same name, he would have lived at the time of Oedipus. The third tripod bears the inscription again in hexameter verse: . ("Laodamas, while he reigned, dedicated this cauldron to Apollo, the sure of aim, as a lovely offering").

Hyginus' account
Hyginus recounts the following legends about the development of the alphabet:

Diodorus' account
Some ancient Greek scholars argued that the Greek alphabet should not be attributed to the Phoenician alphabet. Diodorus Siculus in his Historical Library, Book 5, suggests that the Phoenicians merely "changed the form and shape" of earlier letters:

Plutarch's account
In his essay "On the Malice of Herodotus", Plutarch criticizes Herodotus for prejudice and misrepresentation. Furthermore, he argues that Gephyraei were Euboeans or Eretrians and he doubts the reliability of Herodotus' sources.

Plutarch and other ancient Greek writers credited the legendary Palamedes of Nauplion on Euboea with the invention of the supplementary letters not found in the original Phoenician alphabet. The distinction between Eta and Epsilon and between Omega and Omicron, adopted in the Ionian standard, was traditionally attributed to Simonides of Ceos (556-469).

Plutarch goes further back to describe an older Greek writing system, similar as he attested to the Egyptian writing. In his "Discourse Concerning Socrates's Daemon", he describes how Agesilaus king of Sparta, uncovers Alcmene's tomb at Haliartus and discovers a brazen plate on which a very ancient script was written, much older than the Ancient Greek alphabet. Agesilaus sent a transcript to Egypt in order to be translated back into Ancient Greek. Agetoridas the Spartan travelled to Memphis of Egypt and gave the transcript to Chonouphis the Egyptian priest. Some scholars speculate that this plate was written in Linear B. Agesilaus' decision to have text sent to Egypt is not unreasonable; it is widely accepted that Ancient Egyptians during the 4th century BC were able to translate to and from various other languages; they used three different writing systems within Egypt: hieroglyphic script, hieratic and demotic; this tradition continued during the Hellenistic period when all kinds of scripts were translated and copies were added to the library of Alexandria; one example today of a script written in three forms is the Rosetta Stone that appears in three texts: in ancient Egyptian hieroglyphs, in Egyptian demotic, and in ancient Greek. And therefore, as the story goes, the Egyptian priest, having studied the script and translated it, concluded that the writing enjoined the Greeks to institute games in honor of the Muses.

Restructuring of the Phoenician abjad 

The majority of the letters of the Phoenician alphabet were adopted into Greek with much the same sounds as they had had in Phoenician. However, Phoenician, like other Semitic scripts, has a range of consonants, commonly called gutturals, that did not exist in Greek: ʼāleph , hē , ḥēth , and ʽayin . Of these, only ḥēth was retained in Greek as a consonant, eta, representing the  sound in those dialects that had an [h], while the consonants ʼāleph, hē and ʽayin became the vowels alpha , e  and o , respectively.

Phoenician had foreshadowed the development of vowel letters with a limited use of matres lectionis, that is, consonants that pulled double duty as vowels, which for historical reasons occurred mostly at the ends of words. By this point in time, Greek had lost its  sound, so Phoenician yōdh was used only for its vocalic value, becoming the Greek vowel letter iota . However, several Greek dialects still had a  sound, and here wāw was used for both of its Phoenician values, but with different forms: as the Greek letter digamma for the consonant , and as the letter upsilon for the vowel . Upsilon was added at the end of the alphabet, perhaps to avoid upsetting the alphabetic order that was used in Greek numerals.

All Phoenician letters had been acrophonic, and they remained so in Greek. Only the letter  'ayin for  necessitated a change of name (o, later o micron).

Phoenician also had an "emphatic" consonant, ṭēth, which did not exist in Greek. However, Greek had an aspiration distinction that Phoenician lacked, and used ṭēth for the aspirated .

The Phoenician consonants kaph and qōph represented sounds that were not distinctive in Greek—at most, they may have been identified with allophones determined by the following vowel. The letter qoppa was used in certain Greek dialects (notably the western dialects, which ultimately gave rise to Etruscan and eventually the Latin alphabet), but elsewhere dropped out of general use.

Phoenician had three letters, sāmekh, ṣādē and šin, representing three or probably four voiceless sibilant sounds, whereas Greek only required one. The history here is complicated, but basically sāmekh dropped out in certain dialects, and was reused to represent  in others, while usage for the  sound varied between ṣādē and šin. The letter now known as sigma took its name from sāmekh but its form from šin, while the letter San, which occurred in a few dialects only, took its name from šin but its place in the alphabet from ṣādē.

For the special case of zeta, see Zeta (letter).

Epichoric alphabets

In the 8th to 6th centuries, local or epichoric variants of the alphabet developed. They are classified into three main groups, following Adolf Kirchhoff (1887): green (Cretan), red (Euboean or Western) and blue (Ionic, Attic and Corinthian). The main distinction is in the supplemental signs added to the Phoenician core inventory.

With the exception of the early Fayum alphabet, which does not fit into the tripartite scheme, all abecedaries add Υ to the Phoenician inventory.

Additional letters
In some, but not all, Greek dialects, additional letters were created to represent aspirated versions of Κ and Π (an aspirated version of Τ already existed as described above) and combinations of Κ and Π with Σ. There was some variation between dialects as to the symbols used:

  could be Κ, ΚΗ, Ψ, or Χ
  could be Π, ΠΗ, or Φ
  could be ΚΣ, ΧΣ, Χ, or Ξ
  could be ΠΣ, ΦΣ, or Ψ

Greek, like Phoenician, made a distinction for vowel length; indeed, Greek had five short vowels and seven long vowels, but only five vowel letters. As in Phoenician, the difference in length was not originally made in writing. However, by the 6th century BC the letter eta (not needed for a consonant in eastern dialects of Greek, which lacked ) came to stand for the long vowel , and a new letter, omega, was developed for long . The provenance of omega is not known, but it is generally assumed to derive from omicron with a line drawn under it.

Standardization – the Ionic alphabet

In 403/2 BC, following the devastating defeat in the Peloponnesian War and the restoration of democracy, the Athenians voted to abandon the old Attic alphabet (Pre-Euclidean alphabet) and to introduce a standardized variant of the eastern Ionic alphabet, after a proposal by archon Eucleides. This Euclidean alphabet included eta and omega, which concluded the process of adapting the Phoenician script so that all vowels could be written systematically, thus becoming the first 'true' alphabet.  Apparently, some thirty years later, the same alphabet was introduced to Boeotia, having been adopted perhaps a little earlier in Macedonia, and went on in the course of the 4th century to displace the local alphabets throughout the whole Greek-speaking world.

The Ionic alphabet included a new letter, omega, at the end of the alphabet, and standardised the representation of various sounds that had varied from one dialect to another, as follows:

A symbol based on the left-hand half (Ͱ) of the letter Η was therefore sometimes used to indicate the presence of  where necessary, and its absence was indicated by a symbol based on the right half.

By about 200 BC, a system of diacritical marks was invented, representing the tone accents in use in Ancient Greek. This also helped to indicate the length of the vowels Α, Ι, and Υ in certain cases (for instance a circumflex can only occur on a long vowel), but Greek orthography has never had a comprehensive way of indicating vowel length, and this distinction has in any case been lost in Modern Greek. This innovation of accents, as well as that of punctuation marks, has been credited to Aristophanes of Byzantium (257 – c. 185 BC).

Later developments

By the time of late antiquity and the early Byzantine period, two different styles of handwriting had developed, both suitable to the act of writing with quill and ink on soft materials (paper or parchment). The uncial script consisted of large upright letter glyphs, similar to those used in inscriptions on stone and to the modern uppercase glyphs. It was used mainly for carefully produced book manuscripts. For other types of writing, for instance private letters, documents and other types of everyday writing, a cursive script had developed that used slanted, interconnected glyphs and many ligatures.

From the mid-9th century AD onwards, the uncial script was replaced in book writing by a new writing style, the Greek minuscule, which used more compact, rounded letter shapes and was partly based on the earlier cursive. This innovation may have centered on the scribal work of the Stoudion monastery in Constantinople. The earliest type of books written in minuscule, dated from the mid-9th to mid-10th century, are called codices vetustissimi ('oldest codices'). During the following centuries, this style of writing was further developed and took on more cursive elements again. This became the dominant type of handwriting until the post-Byzantine period.

Together with the minuscule letter shapes, Greek writing also began to use word-boundary spaces and diacritics (i.e. the accent marks and breathings of polytonic orthography) more regularly. Some punctuation began also to be employed. The iota subscript was employed from the 13th century onwards.

Often, in medieval manuscripts, old uncial letter forms were mixed in with the normal minuscule letters for writing titles or for emphasizing the initial letter of a word or sentence. Like in Latin, this became the root of the modern innovation of letter case, the systematic distinction between uppercase and lowercase letters in orthography. The uppercase letters of modern orthography are derived from the uncial script, while the lowercase letters are derived from minuscules.

The invention of printing saw the codification of a more fixed set of letter structures. Greek handwriting made extensive use of ligatures with letters written differently depending on their place in the word. Early printers, such as Aldus Manutius and Claude Garamond, attempted to imitate this, basing their printing on the writing of Greek scribes, producing a style text similar to modern italics. As Greece was occupied by the Ottoman Empire until the nineteenth century, early printers of (mostly ancient) Greek were mostly based in western Europe; few were Greek. This led to the adoption of writing conventions for Greek such as letter case influenced by printing and developments in the Latin alphabet. Cursive-inspired Greek print slowly disappeared during the eighteenth and nineteenth centuries in favour of an upright and less ornamented style of writing more like Latin print.

In 1982, the monotonic orthography was officially adopted, abandoning the rough and smooth breathings (since the  sound had long since disappeared) and reducing the three types of accent mark to one (since the tone accent had been replaced by a stress accent).

Greek pronunciation has also changed considerably since ancient times, but these changes have not been apparent from the orthography, which has remained conservative — see Greek alphabet for a summary of the current situation.

Names of the letters
The names of some letters were changed in order to distinguish them from certain digraphs which had become homophonous, as follows:

Greek numerals
The letters of the alphabet were used in the system of Greek numerals. For this purpose the letters digamma and qoppa (but not san) were retained although they had gone out of general use, and the obscure letter sampi was added at the end of the alphabet. Digamma was often replaced in numerical use by stigma (Ϛ), originally a ligature of sigma and tau, or even the sequence sigma-tau (στ').

Diffusion
The Old Italic and Anatolian alphabets are, like the Greek alphabet, attested from the 8th century BC. The Old Italic scripts trace their lineage from the Eubeoan variant of the Greek script, which was different from the Ionian alphabet still used today.

See also
Linear A

Notes

Bibliography
 
 Peter T Daniels and William Bright, The World's Writing Systems, Oxford University Press, 1996, especially Section 21 "Transmission of the Phoenician Script to the West" (Pierre Swiggers) and Section 22 "The Greek Alphabet" (Leslie Threatte).
 Lilian Hamilton "Anne" Jeffery, The local scripts of archaic Greece: a study of the origin of the Greek alphabet and its development from the eighth to the fifth centuries B.C., Oxford, 1961, . The standard reference.
 P. Kyle McCarter, Jr., The antiquity of the Greek alphabet and the early Phoenician scripts, Harvard Semitic monographs, 1975. .
 .
 
 Joseph Naveh, "Some Semitic epigraphical considerations in the antiquity of the Greek alphabet", American journal of archaeology 77: 1-8 (1973). Argues for an earlier date of transmission.
 .
 Barry B. Powell, "Homer and the Origin of the Greek Alphabet," Cambridge University Press, 1991.
 .
 Robert R. Stieglitz, "The Letters of Kadmos: Mythology, Archaeology, and Eteocretan", Pepragmena tou Diethnous Kretologikou Synedriou (Herakleio, 29 August – 3 September 1976), Athens, 1981.

External links
POINIKASTAS: Epigraphic Sources for Early Greek Writing: a database archive on early Greek inscriptions based on the Lilian H. Jeffery's archive.

Greek alphabet
Alphabet
History of writing
Palaeography